The 2018 Sudan Premier League is the 47th season of top-tier football in Sudan. The season began on 3 February 2018.

First stage

Group A

Group B

Championship playoff

Relegation playoff

Promotion/relegation playoff
First Legs [Oct 10]

Hilal Fasher   1-0 Ahli Khartoum  

Ahli W. Medani 2-1 Hilal Kaduqli  

Second Legs

[Oct 13]

Hilal Kaduqli  2-0 Ahli Wad Medani 

[Oct 14]

Ahli Khartoum  2-0 Hilal Al-Fasher

See also
2018 Sudan Cup

References

Sudan Premier League seasons
football
Sudan